Hardcore Justice, originally known as Hard Justice, is an annual professional wrestling Impact Plus event produced by Impact Wrestling. It was originally introduced as a pay-per-view (PPV) event held by Total Nonstop Action Wrestling (TNA) in 2005. The first event was held in May 2005 and since 2006, they have all been held in August. Until 2010, the event was known as Hard Justice. TNA dropped Hardcore Justice as a pay-per-view event in 2013 after announcing only four pay-per-view events would take place through the year and it was retained as a special episode of TNA's weekly broadcast of Impact Wrestling.

Dates and venues

References

External links
 ImpactWrestling.com – the official website of Total Nonstop Action Wrestling